Fudbalski klub Željezničar Banja Luka (English: Football Club Željezničar Banja Luka) is a professional association football club from the city of Banja Luka that is situated in Bosnia and Herzegovina. It is one of the oldest clubs in the country.

The club currently plays in the First League of the Republika Srpska and plays its home matches on the Predgrađe Stadium, which has a capacity of 3,000 seats.

Honours

Domestic

League
Second League of the Republika Srpska:
Winners (1): 2016–17 
Regional League of the Republika Srpska:
Winners (1): 2015–16

Players

Current squad

Notable players

 Branislav Krunić

References

External links
FK Željezničar Banja Luka at Facebook

Association football clubs established in 1924
Football clubs in Yugoslavia
Football clubs in Republika Srpska
Football clubs in Bosnia and Herzegovina
Željeznicar Banja Luka
Sport in Banja Luka
1924 establishments in Bosnia and Herzegovina